Scopula aequidistans is a moth of the  family Geometridae. It is found on Timor.

References

Moths described in 1896
aequidistans
Moths of Asia